Bogan is a 2017 Indian Tamil-language action thriller film written and directed by Lakshman and produced by Prabhu Deva (Prabhu Deva Studios) and Ganesh. The film stars Arvind Swamy and Jayam Ravi in titular roles, with Hansika Motwani, Akshara Gowda, Nassar, Ponvannan and Naren in supporting roles. The film story is about the body swapping of a honest police officer, Vikram (Jayam Ravi) and a thief with astral projection power, Aditya (Aravind Swami). Featuring music composed by D. Imman, the film began production during March 2016 and released on 2 February 2017 and received generally positive reviews and become a commercial success.

Plot
Vikram (Jayam Ravi) is an honest cop who serves as the Assistant Commissioner of Police (ACP) in Chennai. He has a team of police officers, namely, Sathya (Varun), Akshara (Akshara Gowda), and Prasad (Nagendra Prasad). He lives with his parents, elder sister (Sindhu Shyam), and brother-in-law (Prakash Rajan). His family sets up an arranged marriage for him with Mahalakshmi (Hansika).  

Vikram is tasked with tracking Aadhithya Maravarman (Arvind Swami), a monarch's son and a crooked thief, who mysteriously became rich by robbing jewels and money. He is also involved in drug trading and pumping business. Aadhithya uses an ancient manuscript, which enables him to access Astral Projection by looking straight at their eyes. While interrogating Aadhithya after catching him , Prasad is killed by Sathya, (whose body is occupied by Aadhithya). When Vikram goes to shoot Aadhithya out of anger, Aadhithya enters Vikram's body and begins impersonating him, while Vikram is unconscious. Aadithya, now in Vikram's body, masks the killing of Vikram's best friend by saying that Sathya and Prasad had personal vengeance. After coming to Vikram's home, Aadhithya comes across Maha. He lusts for her and even pinches her belly in the car, but  forgets about her eventually to focus on his revenge on Vikram. Meanwhile, Vikram, who now is trapped in Aadithya's body, is surprised to find himself imprisoned, and gets a visit from Aadithya, who tells him about his plan to make Vikram lose his job and free himself. Afterwards, Vikram manages  to  convince Sathya that he is not Adithya and escapes from prison. After escaping from the prison, Vikram calls the Chennai City Police Commissioner Rajkumar (Ponvannan) and tells the mishaps of events which occurred. Aadhithya overhears their conversation and kills the superintendent. Aadhitya later kills Akshara when she is informed by Satya. Aadhithya also reveals that he has a confession video which says that Vikram  blamed Aadhithya  for his father's mistake.

At the same time, Aadhithya  unlocks Vikram's police data and takes the video evidence of his father, who Aadithya had impersonated , robbing the bank  and threatens to reveal it to the public, but Vikram contacts Professor Chezhiyan (Nassar), Aadhithya's head in archaeology where he gets the manuscript which gives him his power. Chezhiyan thinks that he is being cheated and goes to Aadhithya, but Aadhithya reveals himself to be in Vikram's body, and makes Chezhiyan his bait to catch Vikram while in the complex where Vikram was supposed to meet Chezhiyan. When Aadhithya tracks Chezhiyan, Vikram hides and talks to Chezhiyan, who says that Aadhithya's power is only in his body (in which Vikram is) and in other bodies, his power does not work, so Vikram uses Chezhiyan to take the manuscript from the commissioner's office. Aadhithya later kills Chezhiyan.

Vikram puts a bomb on himself so that Aadhithya may get scared that if his body goes away, he will not be able to use his powers. Vikram and Aadhithya switch over to their original bodies after Vikram threatens to harm Aadithya's body,  and Aadhithya pleads with Vikram to diffuse his bomb. Vikram, who had double-crossed Aadhithya, knocks him out, and while taking him to arrest, Aadhithya switches his soul to Vikram's father Arumugam (Aadukalam Naren) and beats Vikram. He then switches to Maha's body, stabs him, and threatens to kill Mahalakshmi if he does not remove his bomb. Vikram defuses the bomb. As Vikram had double-crossed and betrayed him, Aadhithya drives off with the unconscious Mahalakshmi. Vikram chases them and ends up in the coast. A weakened Vikram fights Aadhithya. Aadhithya quickly but brutally beats up Vikram. But Vikram snaps back and fights Aadhithya. Vikram fractured Aadhithya's neck and left hand and returns home with Maha.

In the end, to everyone's horror, Aadhithya survives and glares into the screen, which goes off with the title "Bogan 2 will continue".

Cast

Production
Following the commercial success of Romeo Juliet (2015), Lakshman and Jayam Ravi announced that they would collaborate for another venture together. In August 2015, Prabhu Deva revealed that his new film studio, Prabhu Deva Studios, would associate with the actor-director pair as the producer and a launch event was held for the film, alongside Deva's other productions Sometimes (2017) and Vinodhan (2017). Lakshman initially wanted Vijay Sethupathi to portray a second leading role in the film, but his unavailability led him to consider alternate options. After discussing the role with Bobby Simha, Lakshman finalised Arvind Swamy for the role, with the actor being seen with Jayam Ravi again after the success of Thani Oruvan (2015). Meanwhile, Hansika Motwani, who starred in Romeo Juliet, also joined the team of the film during late 2015. Akshara Gowda joined the cast of the film during the first schedule and revealed that she would portray a police officer, while the co-producer Ganesh's nephew Varun and Prabhu Deva's brother Nagendra Prasad also joined the cast.

Bogan began production during March 2016 with the team filming sequences in Chennai and Pondicherry during the month. A song titled "Damaalu Dumeelu" featuring Jayam Ravi, Akshara Gowda, Varun and Nagendra Prasad shot first at Binny Mills in Chennai, while a press confirmed that most of Romeo Juliet'''s technical crew including music director D. Imman, cinematographer Soundararajan, editor Anthony and stunt master Dhilip Subbarayan, would be retained in Bogan. Lakshman revealed that both Ravi and Arvind Swamy would play "dual-dimensioned" roles of a police officer and a former prince, while Hansika would feature as a homemaker.

In October 2016, the film ran into trouble after an aspiring director, Anthony, alleged that the story of Bogan belonged to him. Anthony claimed that he had begun production on a film titled Halwa starring Lollu Sabha Jeeva for producer Kasthuri Raja in 2011, and after the film ran into production trouble, he had emailed a copy of the script to Bogan's co-producer, Ganesh, who later chose to make it with Lakshman as director. Anthony later claimed that Ganesh had used goondas to attack him, and that he had turned down Vikraman of the Director’s Association's request for him to take away a compensation package. In reply, Lakshman criticised Anthony and threatened him with legal action for trying to slander the film and his name, and revealed that he had been tipped off by producer Nemichand Jhabak and actress Nayanthara about Anthony's attempts to use his story in a different project. Concluding the issue, Vikraman suggested that Anthony's claims were false and that he had no sympathy for the pair of the directors as the story seemed strongly inspired from the English film Face/Off (1997). The film subsequently finished production in early November 2016, after a song choreographed by Sheriff and other patchwork was completed.

Release
The makers of the film initially announced 7 October 2016 as the tentative release date of the film, but were unable to complete the film as early as they had expected. A second proposed release date of 23 December 2016 was also postponed after the makers were affected by the 2016 Indian banknote demonetisation issue. Further dates of 26 January and 9 February were also scheduled to avoid a clash with Studio Green's big budget Si3 (2017), but after Singam 3 was moved to 9 February, the makers of Bogan confirmed that they would release the film on 2 February 2017. The satellite rights of the film were sold to Sun TV.It was dubbed into Hindi as the same title in 2018 and premiered on Star Gold.

In their review of Bogan, The Hindu concluded that it was "a fair-enough popcorn thriller, anchored by a terrific Arvind Swamy" and stated that it was an improvement from Lakshman's previous film. Sify.com provided a positive review stating that the film was "entertaining and engaging" and that "Lakshman proves that he is a director with substance and can make good commercial entertainers" and that "Bogan is his breakthrough film and he is here to stay as a filmmaker". The reviewer added that "overall, Bogan is worthy of a watch for its new theme, rich visuals and music, fantastic performances by Jayam Ravi and Arvind Swamy and fine making by Lakshman". In contrast, another critic on Sify.com stated, "On paper, Bogan comes across as a great story ideaone that involves soul-swappingbut when translated on screen, it becomes one of those films which has a shaky start, impresses midway and then loses steam towards the end trying to play to the gallery." Similarly, the critic from The Times of India added Lakshman "gives us a thriller that begins well and is engaging for the most part, before losing some intensity towards the end".

Soundtrack

The film's soundtrack is scored by D. Imman. The audio rights of the film were acquired by Sony Music India, and the complete album was released on 3 December 2016. Actor Arvind Swamy recorded a song for the film as a playback singer for the first time in his career, after having previously recited lines for songs in Iruvar (1997) and Thani Oruvan (2015). Anirudh Ravichander also recorded a song titled "Damaal Dumeel", which was released earlier than the soundtrack as a single, following the success of the song "Dandanakka" from his previous work with Imman in Lakshman's Romeo Juliet'' (2015). Luksimi Sivaneswaralingam from Canada and Inno Genga from the United Kingdomboth Tamil people of Sri Lankan originwere given the opportunity by Imman to sing in the film, while established singers including Shankar Mahadevan, Shreya Ghoshal and Vijay Prakash also worked on the album.

Awards

References

External links
 

2017 films
2017 action thriller films
2010s Tamil-language films
Films scored by D. Imman
Indian action thriller films
Body swapping in films
Films about identity theft
Films shot in Chennai
Films shot in Puducherry
Films involved in plagiarism controversies